Martin Richard Attlee, 2nd Earl Attlee (10 August 1927 – 27 July 1991) was a British politician and a founding member of the Social Democratic Party. He was the only son of former British Prime Minister Clement Attlee.

Early life
Attlee suffered badly from dyslexia, and was a poor student as a child. His father chose to tackle this issue by having his son educated at Millfield School, which under its founding headmaster, the educationalist Jack Meyer, was noted for its progressive approach to reading problems. Attlee did well enough to study at the School of Navigation at University College, Southampton (now the University of Southampton), and served from 1945 to 1950 in the Merchant Navy. After a spell working for Iberian Airways, among other companies, he eventually joined British Rail's Southern Region, working for a long time in its public relations department; it was this experience that prompted him to write his book Bluff Your Way in PR (1971).

Parliamentary career
Attlee inherited the earldom, which carried with it a seat in the House of Lords, on his father's death in 1967. For some fourteen years he sat on the Labour Party benches, as his father had done, but in 1981 he joined the Social Democratic Party (SDP). After the SDP opted for merger with the Liberal Party, Attlee was one of the minority who chose to remain in the 'continuing' SDP led by David Owen, standing for that party in the Hampshire Central European Parliament by-election in December 1988, where he received 5,952 votes (7.7%). At the time, he commented that "Some people say that my father must be turning in his grave. But if so, it would only be because of the sight of the present so-called Labour Party."

Personal life
Attlee married Anne Henderson on 16 February 1955. They had a son and a daughter before divorcing in 1988. Attlee married Margaret Gouriet the same year.

Death
Attlee died at Southampton General Hospital on 27 July 1991 at the age of 63 following a stroke. His peerage was inherited by his son John, who takes the Conservative whip.

Arms

References

Attlee, Martin Attlee, 2nd Earl
Attlee, Martin Attlee, 2nd Earl
Attlee, Martin Attlee, 2nd Earl
Martin
Attlee, Martin Attlee, 2nd Earl
Attlee, Martin Attlee, 2nd Earl
Attlee, Martin Attlee, 2nd Earl
Social Democratic Party (UK) hereditary peers
Social Democratic Party (UK, 1988) peers
People educated at Millfield